The 128th Division() was a military formation of the People's Liberation Army, which was created in November 1948 under the Regulation of the Redesignations of All Organizations and Units of the Army, issued by the Central Military Commission on November 1, 1948, basing on the 17th Division, 6th Column of the Northeastern Field Army. Its origin can be traced back to the 3rd Detachment of the Shandong People's Anti-Japanese Guerilla Force of the Eighth Route Army, activated in June 1938.

The division was a part of the 43rd Corps and was composed of the 382nd, 383rd, and 384th Regiments.

In April 1950, the division participated in the Hainan Island Campaign along with the corps. After the campaign, the division garrisoned in Hainan island.

In January 1953, the 508th Artillery Regiment and the 333rd Tank Self-Propelled Artillery Regiment were activated and attached to the Division. By then the division was composed of:
382nd Regiment
383rd Regiment
384th Regiment
508th Artillery Regiment
333rd Tank Self-Propelled Artillery Regiment

In April 1960, the division was redesignated as the 128th Army Division().

In January 1961, the division was put under the Hainan Military District's control after the disbandment of the 43rd Corps.

In October 1961, the division exchanged its 333rd Tank Self-Propelled Artillery Regiment with the 127th Army Division's 332nd Tank Self-Propelled Artillery Regiment.

In November 1964 the division moved to Huiyang, Guangdong and attached to the 42nd Army Corps; the 332nd Tank Self-Propelled Artillery Regiment left the division and maintained on Hainan Island.

In July 1968, the 43rd Army Corps was reactivated. The 128th Army Division then moved to Liuzhou, Guangxi and attached to the 43rd Army Corps.

In October 1968, the division moved to Gong County, Henan along with the army corps.

In June 1969, 508th Artillery Regiment was redesignated as the Artillery Regiment, 128th Army Division.

From February to March 1979, the division was deployed into the Sino-Vietnamese War along with the army corps. The division was mainly engaged in the Battle of Cao Bằng. The division returned to its barracks in April 1979.

In September 1985, the division was reconstituted as the 128th Infantry Division() and transferred to the 20th Army's control after 43rd Army Corps' disbandment. The division maintained as a northern infantry division, category B. By then the division was composed of:
382nd Infantry Regiment
383rd Infantry Regiment
384th Infantry Regiment
Artillery Regiment

In 1996, the division was transferred to People's Armed Police's control and redesignated as the 128th Armed Police Mobile Division(). The division was then composed of:
382nd Armed Police Regiment
383rd Armed Police Regiment
384th Armed Police Regiment
708th Armed Police Regiment

In 2017 the division was inactivated along with the other PAP mobile divisions.

References

Military units and formations of China in the Korean War
128China
Military units and formations disestablished in 1985